

Competitors

Medal summary

Medal table

Medalists

Results by event

Archery

recurve

Athletics

Men

Women

Badminton

Boccia

Cycling

Football 5-a-side

Men

Football 7-a-side

Men

Goalball

Men

Women

Judo

Powerlifting

Men

Shooting

Sitting volleyball

Men

Women

Swimming

Men

Table tennis

Men

Wheelchair basketbal
Men

Women

Wheelchair Tennis

Men
Singles

References

Nations at the 2014 Asian Para Games
Iran at the Asian Para Games
2014 in Iranian sport